Beisenherz is a surname. Notable people with the surname include:

Heinrich Beisenherz (1891–1977), German art director and painter
Rie Beisenherz (1901–1992), Dutch swimmer

de:Beisenherz